Mingoola is a rural locality in the Southern Downs Region, Queensland, Australia. It is on the Queensland border with New South Wales.

Geography 
Mingoola is located on the border of Queensland and New South Wales with the adjacent locality over the border also being called Mingoola.

History 
The locality probably takes its name from the pastoral run called Mangoola or Moongoola in early memoirs of Oscar De Satge.

Land in Mingoola was open for selection on 17 April 1877;  were available.

References 

Southern Downs Region
Localities in Queensland